Haier Pakistan is a consumer electronics and home appliances company in Pakistan.Javed Afridi's Ruba digital has 45%shares in haier Pakistan. Established in 2000, it is a subsidiary of the Chinese multinational group Haier.

It is one of the largest companies in Pakistan's home appliances market, in terms of sales and revenues generated. Common appliances produced by the group include refrigerators, air conditioning units, washing machines, kitchen appliances, and handsets. 

In 2015, Haier invested $5 million to establish a mobile phone assembly plant in Lahore, which would annually manufacture over 1.5 million cellphones for the Pakistani market. In the first half of 2017, Haier sold more than 270,000 refrigerators, exceeding previous years' figures. However, there is an increasing concern over customer service issues and Haier Pakistan's control over its third party dealership. 

The group's CEO is Javed Afridi and it notably owns the Peshawar Zalmi franchise in the Pakistan Super League, which was acquired for $16 million over a ten-year period. The group has also sponsored other cricket and sports tournaments in the country.

References

External links
 

Haier
Home appliance manufacturers of Pakistan
Mobile phone companies of Pakistan
Electronics companies established in 2000
Pakistani subsidiaries of foreign companies
Peshawar Zalmi
Electronics companies of Pakistan